Beak Island is an arc-shaped island,  long and  high, lying  northeast of Eagle Island in the northeast part of Prince Gustav Channel. It was probably first seen in 1902–03 by members of the Swedish Antarctic Expedition under Otto Nordenskiöld. The Falkland Islands Dependencies Survey surveyed Beak Island in 1945 and so named it because of its shape and relative position to nearby Tail Island and Eagle Island.

Bear Island is volcanic in origin, having been K-Ar dated 1.7 ± 0.2 and 2.0 ± 0.2 million years old. It forms part of the James Ross Island Volcanic Group.

See also 
 List of Antarctic and sub-Antarctic islands

References 

Islands of Trinity Peninsula
Volcanic islands